Mount Nicholson is a  tall mountain located in Wan Chai District, on Hong Kong Island, Hong Kong. The hill is believed to be named for Hong Kong Volunteer Corps Adjunct Lieutenant W.C.A. Nicholson.

The western side of the mountain is flanked by the Hong Kong Trail Section 4 - Black's Link. On the eastern side are a few residential blocks close to Wong Nai Chung Gap Road. Mount Cameron is found to the west and separated by the Aberdeen Tunnel. Microwave equipment for television broadcasting (one concrete structure) are found at the mountain's peak and closed from public access by fencing and topped with barbed wire.

A climbing wall is found on the northside of the mountain with access via Wong Nai Chung Gap Road.

Flora and fauna
Part of the mountain is covered with trees and other plants. Camellia hongkongensis and Rhododendron hongkongensis, two plant species native to Hong Kong, are first discovered on the mountain.

Commonly found animals are wild boars, porcupines, and stray cats.

The 1st Rover Moot in Hong Kong was held by The Scout Association of Hong Kong in August 1940 at Mount Nicholson.

References

See also

 List of mountains, peaks and hills in Hong Kong
Hong Kong Trail

Nicholson
Wan Chai District